The Tacarcuna wood quail (Odontophorus dialeucos) is a species of bird in the family Odontophoridae, the New World quail. It is found in Colombia and Panama.

Taxonomy and systematics

Some authors have suggested that the Tarcarcuna wood quail and gorgeted wood quail (Odontophorus strophium), Venezuelan wood quail (O. columbianus), black-fronted wood quail (O. atrifons), and black-breasted wood quail (O. lecuolaemus) are actually a single species, but this treatment has not been accepted by the major avian taxonomic systems. The species is monotypic.

Description

Males are estimated to weigh  and females . Males' crown and throat are black and the supercilium, lores, and chin are white. The sides and back of the neck are cinnamon. The back and rump are olive brown with black vermiculation and the breast and belly are chestnut speckled with white. Females are similar but their underparts are more tawny brown. Juveniles are similar to the female but the white of the chin is smaller and the black of the throat broader.

Distribution and habitat

The Tacarcuna wood quail is found along the Tacarcuna Ridge in Panama's Darién Province and Colombia's Chocó Department.

Behavior

Feeding

No information about the Tacarcuna wood quail's foraging behavior or diet has been published.

Breeding

A juvenile Tacarcuna wood quail was collected in early June but no other information about the species' breeding phenology has been published.

Vocalization

The Tacarcuna wood quail's vocalizations are poorly known.

Status

The IUCN originally assessed the Tacarcuna wood quail as Near Threatened but has rated it Vulnerable since 2000. "The very small range of this species renders it susceptible to stochastic events and human activities".

References

External links
BirdLife Species Factsheet.

Birds of Panama
Birds of Colombia
Tacarcuna wood quail
Taxa named by Alexander Wetmore
Taxonomy articles created by Polbot